Mauro Joel Carli (born 19 April 1986) is an Argentine footballer who plays as a centre-back for Botafogo.

Club career
Born in Mar del Plata, Carli started his senior career with hometown club Aldosivi. After loan stints at Deportivo Merlo and Gimnasia La Plata, he moved to Quilmes in July 2011.

Quilmes
Carli made his debut for Quilmes on 7 August 2011, starting in a 1–3 away loss against Boca Unidos in the Primera B Nacional. He scored his first goal for the club on 20 August of the following year, netting the winner in a 2–1 home success against Unión de Santa Fe.

Botafogo
On 3 December 2015, after being regularly used, Carli moved abroad and joined Botafogo.

Career statistics

Honours

Club
Botafogo
 Campeonato Carioca: 2018
 Campeonato Brasileiro Série B: 2021

Notes

References

External links

1986 births
Living people
Sportspeople from Mar del Plata
Argentine footballers
Association football defenders
Argentine Primera División players
Primera Nacional players
Aldosivi footballers
Deportivo Merlo footballers
Club de Gimnasia y Esgrima La Plata footballers
Quilmes Atlético Club footballers
Campeonato Brasileiro Série A players
Botafogo de Futebol e Regatas players
Argentine expatriate footballers
Argentine expatriate sportspeople in Brazil
Expatriate footballers in Brazil
Campeonato Brasileiro Série B players
Primera B Metropolitana players